Srimanta Sankaradeva University of Health Sciences, Guwahati, Assam, India is established in 2009 as per The Srimanta Sankaradeva University of Health Sciences Act, 2007. The Srimanta Sankaradeva University of Health Sciences is the only Health Sciences University in the North Eastern Region with its jurisdiction to the whole of Assam.

Academics 
The University is an affiliating university and has jurisdiction all over Assam. It is also engaged in research work.
Presently there are 47 numbers of affiliated Institutions under this University.

Affiliated colleges are:

Research institutions
 Lokopriya Gopinath Bordoloi Regional Institute of Mental Health (LGBRIMH), Tezpur
 Dr. B. Borooah Cancer Institute

Medical colleges
 Assam Medical College, Dibrugarh
 Fakhruddin Ali Ahmed Medical College & Hospital, Barpeta
 Gauhati Medical College and Hospital, Guwahati
 Jorhat Medical College and Hospital, Jorhat
 Silchar Medical College and Hospital, Silchar
 Tezpur Medical College & Hospital, Sonitpur
 Diphu Medical College and Hospital, Diphu
 Lakhimpur Medical College and Hospital, North Lakhimpur
 Dhubri Medical College and Hospital, Dhubri

Dental Colleges
 Regional Dental College, Guwahati
 Government Dental College, Dibrugarh
Government Dental College, Silchar

Nursing Colleges
 Regional College of Nursing, Guwahati
 B.Sc. Nursing College, Dibrugarh
 B.Sc. Nursing College, Silchar
 Army Institute of Nursing, Guwahati

Ayurvedic Colleges
Government Ayurvedic College, Guwahati

Homeopathic College
 Assam Homeopathic College, Nagaon 
 SJN Homoeopathic Medical College, Guwahati
 Dr. JKS Homoeopathic Medical College, Jorhat

Community Medical institute
 Medical Institute, Jorhat

References

External links 

Medical and health sciences universities in India
Medical colleges in Assam
Universities in Assam
Universities and colleges in Guwahati
Educational institutions established in 2009
2009 establishments in Assam
State universities in India